Brian Haynes may refer to:

 Brian Haynes (footballer) (born 1962), retired Trinidad soccer midfielder
 Brian Haynes (canoeist) (1951–2011), British sprint canoer